Prunus incisoserrata (meaning "sharp-toothed flowering cherry") is a species of Prunus native to central China, preferring to grow at 1100–2900m. It is a shrub reaching a height of 2–5m. On Huangshan Mountain it is found growing beneath Prunus clarofolia and alongside fellow shrubs Symplocos paniculata, Hydrangea chinensis, Neillia hanceana, Morus australis and Kerria japonica.

References

External links

incisoserrata
Endemic flora of China
Plants described in 2010